Claire Colebrook (or Claire Mary Colebrook) (born 25 October 1965), is an Australian cultural theorist, currently appointed Edwin Erle Sparks Professor of English at Pennsylvania State University. She has published numerous works on Gilles Deleuze, visual art, poetry, queer theory, film studies, contemporary literature, theory, cultural studies and visual culture. She is the editor (with Tom Cohen) of the Critical Climate Change Book Series at Open Humanities Press.

Biography
Colebrook's education consists of a Bachelor of Arts taken at the University of Melbourne (1987), a Bachelor of Letters at Australian National University (1989) and a Doctor of Philosophy earned at the University of Edinburgh (1993).

Publications
Books
New Literary Histories (1997)
Ethics and Representation (1999)
Deleuze: A Guide for the Perplexed (1997)
Gilles Deleuze (2002)
Understanding Deleuze (2002)
Irony in the Work of Philosophy (2002)
Gender (2003)
Irony (2004)
Milton, Evil and Literary History (2008)
Deleuze and the Meaning of Life (2010)
William Blake and Digital Aesthetics (2011)

Co-authored
Theory and the Disappearing Future with Tom Cohen and J. Hillis Miller (2011)

Co-edited
Deleuze and Feminist Theory with Ian Buchanan (2000)
Deleuze and History with Jeff Bell (2008)
Deleuze and Gender with Jami Weinstein (2009)
Deleuze and Law with Rosi Braidotti and Patrick Hanafin (2009)

Grants and awards
British Academy Overseas Conference Award (2004)
British Academy/Australian Academy Joint Award (with Dr David Bennett) (2006)
Carnegie Trust Fund (2006)
British Academy Small Grant (2006)
Huntington Library Fellowship (2007)
Arts and Humanities Research Council Leave Scheme (2007)
Goldsmiths College (2008)
Archive and Knowledge Transfer (2008)
Distinguished Visiting Professor, Friedrich Schlegel Graduate School, Free University, Berlin (2010)

References

External links
  Claire Colebrook's e-book: Death of the PostHuman: Essays on Extinction, Vol. 1 at Open Humanities Press
  Claire Colebrook's e-book: Sex After Life: Essays on Extinction, Vol. 2 at Open Humanities Press

1965 births
Living people
Pennsylvania State University faculty
Philosophers of art
Feminist theorists
20th-century Australian philosophers
21st-century Australian philosophers
20th-century Australian writers
21st-century Australian writers
20th-century Australian women writers
21st-century Australian women writers
Critical theorists
Poststructuralists
University of Melbourne alumni
Australian National University alumni
Alumni of the University of Edinburgh
Postmodern feminists
Australian feminist writers
University of Melbourne women